The 2011 Super Copa Telcel is the inaugural season of the Super Copa Telcel. This cup is the Mexican branch of SEAT León Supercopa. The serial was presented by Michel Jourdain in December 2010. SEAT León will be the car of the category. After 8 double events the Mexican driver Ricardo Pérez de Lara was proclaimed champion. Pérez de Lara won 4 races in the season.

Cars

All the cars were SEAT Leon FWD.

Continental supplied the tires.

Drivers

Schedule
The calendar was presented in December, but was changed in March 2011.

Calendar changes
 Aguascalientes was changed by Zacatecas because the road track was not complete for the race.
 Guadalajara was changed by Pachuca because the track was damaged by floods in the track.

Results

Races

Standings

References

Super Copa